Armstrong College may refer to:

 Armstrong College (California), a historic building in Berkeley, California, US
 Georgia Southern University-Armstrong Campus, formerly Armstrong College, Savannah, Georgia, US
 Herbert W. Armstrong College, an uncredited theology college run by the Philadelphia Church of God, Edmond, Oklahoma, US
 Armstrong College, a former College of Durham University, UK and a predecessor institution of Newcastle University, UK